Atenica is a village in the municipality of Čačak, Serbia. According to the 2011 census, Atenica has a population of 558 people.

References

Populated places in Moravica District